Cyclophora compacta is a moth in the  family Geometridae. It is found on the Kei Islands and in New Guinea and Queensland.

Subspecies
Cyclophora compacta compacta
Cyclophora compacta niveostilla (Prout, 1934)

References

Moths described in 1898
Cyclophora (moth)
Moths of Indonesia
Moths of New Guinea
Moths of Australia